The following is a list of the largest inflorescences known from plants that produce seeds.

See also
List of world records held by plants
List of largest seeds

References

Flowers
Lists of plants
Inflorescences